Ira Walton Drew (August 31, 1878 – February 12, 1972) was a Democratic member of the U.S. House of Representatives from Pennsylvania and osteopathic physician.

Biography
Ira Drew was born in Hardwick, Vermont.  He apprenticed as a printer, becoming a journeyman in 1899.  He was a newspaper reporter in Burlington, Vermont, from 1899 through 1906, and a reporter and news editor in Boston, Massachusetts from 1906 through 1908.  He graduated from the Philadelphia College of Osteopathy (now the Philadelphia College of Osteopathic Medicine) in 1911 and began the practice of osteopathic medicine in Philadelphia the same year.  He was member of the faculty of the Philadelphia College of Osteopathy from 1912 through 1933.

He was elected as a Democrat to the 75th Congress in 1936, but was an unsuccessful candidate for reelection in 1938.  After his term in congress, he served as a member of the board of trustees of the Philadelphia College of Osteopathy.

He is buried at Whitemarsh Memorial Park in Prospectville, Pennsylvania.

Sources

The Political Graveyard

1878 births
1972 deaths
American osteopathic physicians
Democratic Party members of the United States House of Representatives from Pennsylvania
Philadelphia College of Osteopathic Medicine alumni
Physicians from Pennsylvania
People from Hardwick, Vermont